Prunus bracteopadus is a putative species of bird cherry native to the eastern foothills of the Himalayas, Assam and Uttarakhand. It is very closely related to, and perhaps conspecific with, Prunus napaulensis.

Notes

References

Bird cherries
bracteopadus
Flora of Assam (region)
Flora of East Himalaya
Plants described in 1910